Rebecca Collins (born 1944) is a retired American swimmer. On July 20, 1958, she set a new world record in the individual 200 m medley. One year later, on July 19, 1959, she broke the world record of Tineke Lagerberg in the 200 m butterfly. She lost that record to Marianne Heemskerk in 1960, but took it back in 1961. She was also part of the US relay team that set a new world record in the 4×100 m medley at the 1959 Pan American Games. She won another gold medal at those games, in the 100 m butterfly. Between 1959 and 1961 she won seven national titles in individual butterfly and medley events.

After marriage she changed her last name to Furst.

See also
 World record progression 200 metres butterfly
 World record progression 200 metres individual medley

References

1944 births
Living people
American female butterfly swimmers
American female medley swimmers
World record setters in swimming
Swimmers at the 1959 Pan American Games
Pan American Games gold medalists for the United States
Pan American Games medalists in swimming
Medalists at the 1959 Pan American Games
20th-century American women